Saint Methodius of Olympus (died c. 311) was an early Christian bishop, ecclesiastical author, and martyr. Today, he is honored as a saint and Church Father; the Catholic Church commemorates his feast on June 20.

Life 
Few reports have survived on the life of this first systematic opponent of Origen; even these short accounts present many difficulties. Eusebius does not mention him in his Church History, probably because he opposed various theories of Origen, thus Saint Jerome provides the earliest accounts of him. According to him, Methodius suffered martyrdom at Chalcis at the end of the newest persecution, i.e., under Diocletian, Galerius or Maximinus Daia. Although he then adds, "that some assert", that this may have happened under Decius and Valerian a, this statement (ut alii affirmant), adduced even by him as uncertain, is unlikely, given that Methodius also wrote against the Neoplatonic philosopher Porphyry (234–305).

The location of Methodius's episcopal see is a matter of controversy. His writings repeatedly betray a lycian background and hence his see has also been located in that province. Methodius has been called bishop of the Lycian capital Patara, but this tradition first appeared in the late 6th century. Jerome spoke of Methodius as „bishop von Olympus in Lycia and afterwards Bishop of Tyre“. While episcopacy in Tyre is more than doubtful - since only Jerome mentions it, the list of bishops of Tyre does not leave room for Methodius and switching sees was unusual at that time, - Olympus is widely acknowledged as historically correct, e.g. by Theodor Zahn.<ref>Theodor Zahn, "Studien zu Justinus Martyr. Exkurs: Ueber den Bischofssitz des Methodius", Zeitschrift für Kirchengeschichte VIII (1885/86), 15-20.</ref> Franz Diekamp rejects this verdict and argues, that Methodius was bishop of Philippi in Macedonia, because several manuscript mention him as bishop of that city, John of Antioch in 435 numbered Methodius among the bishops of Greece and Illyria und because it is dubious whether, ob Olympus had a bishop in 311 at all. Furthermore, Jerome locating the martyrdom of Methodius in Chalkis in Greece would fit a bishop from Macedonia, but not from Lycia.

 Works 
Methodius had a comprehensive philosophical education, and was an important theologian as well as a prolific and polished author. Chronologically, his works can only be assigned in a general way to the end of the third and the beginning of the 4th century. He became of special importance in the history of theological literature, in that he combated various views of the great Alexandrian, Origen. He particularly attacked his doctrine that man's body at the resurrection is not the same body as he had in life, as well as his idea of the world's eternity. Nevertheless, he recognized the great services of Origen in ecclesiastical theology.

Like Origen, he is strongly influenced by Plato's philosophy, and uses to a great extent the allegorical explanation of Scripture. Of his numerous works only one has come down to us complete in a Greek text: the dialogue on virginity, under the title Symposium, or on Virginity (Symposion e peri hagneias). In the dialogue, composed with reference to Plato's Symposium, he depicts a festive meal of ten virgins in the garden of Arete, at which each of the participators extols Christian virginity and its sublime excellence. It concludes with a hymn on Jesus as the Bridegroom of the Church. Larger fragments are preserved of several other writings in Greek; we know of other works from old versions in Slavonic, though some are abbreviated.

The following works are in the form of dialogue:On Free Will (peri tou autexousiou), an important treatise attacking the Gnostic view of the origin of evil and in proof of the freedom of the human will
 On the Resurrection (Aglaophon e peri tes anastaseos), in which the doctrine that the same body that man has in life will be awakened to incorruptibility at the resurrection is specially put forward in opposition to Origen.

While large portions of the original Greek text of both these writings are preserved, we have only Slavonic versions of the four following shorter treatises:De vita, on life and rational action, which exhorts in particular to contentedness in this life and to the hope of the life to come
 De cibis, on the Jewish dietary laws, and on the young cow, which is mentioned in Leviticus, with allegorical explanation of the Old Testament food-legislation and the red cow (Num., xix)De lepra, on leprosy, to Sistelius, a dialogue between Eubulius (Methodius) and Sistelius on the mystic sense of the Old Testament references to lepers (Lev., xiii)
 De sanguisuga, on the leech in Proverbs (Prov., xxx, 15 sq.) and on the text, "the heavens show forth the glory of God" (Ps. xviii, 2).

Of other writings, no longer extant, Jerome mentions (loc. cit.) a voluminous work against Porphyry, the Neoplatonist who had published a book against Christianity; a treatise on the Pythonissa directed against Origen, commentaries on Genesis and the Canticle of Canticles. Other authors attributed a work On the Martyrs, and a dialogue Xenon to Methodius; in the latter he opposes the doctrine of Origen on the eternity of the world. Gregory Abu'l Faraj attribute to Methodius some kind of work dealing with the patriarchs.

The 7th-century Apocalypse of Pseudo-Methodius is falsely attributed to him. 

Among the editions of his works are: P.G., XVIII; Jahn, S. Methodii opera et S. Methodius platonizans (Halle, 1865); Bonwetsch, Methodius von Olympus: I, Schriften (Leipzig, 1891).

The Byzantine encyclopedia Suda write about his work:

 Doctrines 

Virgin Mary
Methodius's "Oration on Simeon and Anna" is an example of early Christian veneration of Mary as the ever-virgin Mother of God:

Virginity of Jesus Christ
Methodius taught that Jesus Christ remained virgin His whole life as an example of chastity for men:
"What then did the Lord, the Truth and the Light, accomplish on coming down to the world? He preserved His flesh incorrupt in virginity with which he had adorned it. And so let us too, if we are to come to the likeness of God, endeavor to aspire to the virginity of Christ." (Symposium 1.5)

Purpose of Death
Methodius taught in On the Resurrection that it was to prevent sin from remaining forever that God caused man to become mortal:
"In order, then, that man might not be an undying or ever-living evil, as would have been the case if sin were dominant within him, as it had sprung up in an immortal body, and was provided with immortal sustenance, God for this cause pronounced him mortal, and clothed him with mortality. For this is what was meant by the coats of skins, in order that, by the dissolution of the body, sin might be altogether destroyed from the very roots, that there might not be left even the smallest particle of root from which new shoots of sin might again burst forth." (chapter 1 paragraph 4)

Renewal of Creation
Methodius taught in On the Resurrection that while the universe was to be subject to a universal conflagration this was for the renewal and not destruction of the universe:
"But it is not satisfactory to say that the universe will be utterly destroyed, and sea and air and sky will be no longer. For the whole world will be deluged with fire from heaven, and burnt for the purpose of purification and renewal; it will not, however, come to complete ruin and corruption. For if it were better for the world not to be than to be, why did God, in making the world, take the worse course? But God did not work in vain, or do that which was worst....The creation, then, after being restored to a better and more seemly state, remains, rejoicing and exulting over the children of God at the resurrection; for whose sake it now groans and travails, waiting itself also for our redemption from the corruption of the body, that, when we have risen and shaken off the mortality of the flesh, according to that which is written, " Shake off the dust, and arise, and sit down, O Jerusalem, " [ Isaiah 52:2 ] and have been set free from sin, it also shall be freed from corruption and be subject no longer to vanity, but to righteousness. Isaiah says, too, " For as the new heaven and the new earth which I make, remains before me, says the Lord, so shall your seed and your name be; " [ Isaiah 66:22 ] and again, " Thus says the Lord that created the heaven, it is He who prepared the earth and created it, He determined it; He created it not in vain, but formed it to be inhabited. " [ Isaiah 45:18 ] For in reality God did not establish the universe in vain, or to no purpose but destruction, as those weak-minded men say, but to exist, and be inhabited, and continue. Wherefore the earth and the heaven must exist again after the conflagration and shaking of all things." (chapter 1 paragraph 8 excerpt)

 Notes 

References
 

 Further reading 
 Katharina Bracht (ed.), Methodius of Olympus: State of the Art and New Perspectives, Berlin, Walter de Gruyter, 2017.
 Patterson, L. G. (Lloyd George), Methodius of Olympus: Divine Sovereignty, Human Freedom, and Life in Christ'' (Washington: Catholic University of America Press, 1997).

External links 
The Writings of Methodius, Alexander of Lycopolis, Peter of Alexandria : and several fragments 1869 English translation
 At the Internet Archive.
Roger Pearse, The works of Methodius with bibliography of translations.
Methodius of Olympus, On Life and Rational Action – English translation.
Methodius of Olympus, De Cibis – English translation.
Methodius of Olympus, De Sanguisuga (On the Leech) – English translation.
Methodius of Olympus, De Lepra – English translation.

Christian anti-Gnosticism
3rd-century births
3rd-century Christian theologians
4th-century bishops in Roman Anatolia
311 deaths
Saints from Roman Anatolia
4th-century Greek writers
4th-century Christian martyrs
Church Fathers